The 2006 World University Boxing Championships took place in Almaty, Kazakhstan between October 2 and 9 2006. 82 boxers from 14 countries participated at the second edition tournament.

Participating nations

Results
Bronze medals are awarded to both losing finalists.

Medal count table

See also
 2006 World University Championships
 World University Championships

References

World University
World University
Boxing
Sports competitions in Almaty
World University Boxing Championships
Box